The pale or pallid harrier (Circus macrourus) is a migratory bird of prey of the harrier subfamily. The scientific name is derived from the Ancient Greek. Circus is from kirkos, referring to a bird of prey named for its circling flight (kirkos, "circle"), probably the hen harrier and macrourus is "long-tailed", from makros, "long" and -ouros "-tailed".

It breeds in southern parts of eastern Europe and central Asia and Iran and winters mainly in India and southeast Asia. It is a rare but increasing vagrant to Great Britain and western Europe. In 2017 a pair of pallid harriers nested in a barley field in the Netherlands; they raised four chicks, the first recording breeding of the species in the country. In 2019, a pair bred in Spain for the first time.

This medium-sized raptor breeds on open plains, bogs and heathland. In winter it is a bird of open country.

Description 

This is a typical harrier, with long wings held in a shallow V in its low flight. It also resembles other harriers in having distinct male and female plumages. Males weigh  while the slightly larger females weigh . The male is whitish grey above and white below, with narrow black wingtips. It differs from the hen harrier in its smaller size, narrower wings, paler colour, and different wing tip pattern. The female is brown above with white upper tail coverts, hence females and the similar juveniles are often called "ringtails". Her underparts are buff streaked with brown. It is best distinguished from the female hen harrier on structure. It is very similar to the female Montagu's harrier, but has a paler belly and a well defined facial pattern.

Behaviour and ecology

Pallid harriers primarily hunt small mammals and birds, surprising them as they drift low over fields and moors. Other food sources include large insects (typically grasshoppers and locusts), lizards and frogs.
The nest of this species is on the ground. Three to six, but typically four to five whitish eggs are laid.

References

Further reading

External links

 Pallid harrier species text in The Atlas of Southern African Birds
 Iran's Birds - Pallid Harrier (in Persian)
 
 
 
 
 
Website of Harrier Conservation International 

pallid harrier
Birds of prey of Eurasia
Birds of Africa
pallid harrier